Rivne Ukrainian gymnasium (RUG) is a new type school in Rivne, Ukraine. This is reborned First Rivne Ukrainian gymnasium that was founded in 1923 and worked till 1939. In 2003 RUG celebrated 80th anniversary.

External links
The official site of Rivne Ukrainian gymnasium

Schools in Ukraine
Secondary schools in Ukraine